Jeff Douthwaite (September 7, 1929 – September 17, 2008) was an American politician who served in the Washington House of Representatives from 1971 to 1979.

He died of cancer on September 17, 2008, in Seattle, Washington at age 79.

References

1929 births
2008 deaths
Democratic Party members of the Washington House of Representatives
20th-century American politicians